Quercus georgiana, the Georgia oak or Stone Mountain oak, is a rare deciduous red oak, native to the southeastern United States.

Description 
It is classified in the red oak section Quercus sect. Lobatae.

Leaves 

The leaves turn dark red to brown in the autumn, stay on the tree throughout the winter, and fall as the new leaves bud in the spring.

Flowering and fruiting 
Like all oaks, flowering and leaf-out occur in late spring when all frost danger has passed. The flowers are monoecious catkins which, being self-incompatible, require the presence of another oak for pollination.

Twigs and buds 
Twigs are deep red, 1–2 mm in diameter and glabrous. Terminal buds are red-brown, ovoid to subconic, 2.5–5 mm, and glabrous or with scales somewhat ciliate.

Bark 
The bark is gray to light brown, scaly.

Distribution and habitat 
The Georgia oak is native to the southeastern United States, mainly in northern Georgia, but with additional populations in Alabama, North Carolina, and South Carolina. It grows on dry granite and sandstone outcrops of slopes of hills at  altitude.

Georgia oaks are also found at nearby monadnocks, including Panola Mountain and Arabia Mountain in Georgia.

Uses 
It is occasionally cultivated as a specimen or garden tree in USDA plant hardiness zones 5–8. Besides landscape horticulture, the Georgia oak has no commercial uses.

References

External links

 http://www.internationaloaksociety.org/content/quercus-georgiana-stone-mountain-georgia-usa
 http://www.georgiaherbaria.org/
 http://dendro.cnre.vt.edu/DENDROLOGY/syllabus/factsheet.cfm?ID=1023
 https://web.archive.org/web/20170721122735/http://www.arkive.org/georgia-oak/quercus-georgiana/
 http://quercus.myspecies.info/taxonomy/term/64/media
 http://www.namethatplant.net/plantdetail.shtml?plant=2187
 http://www.discoverlife.org/mp/20q?search=Quercus+georgiana
 https://www.forestryimages.org/browse/subthumb.cfm?sub=11370
 http://www.scottranger.com/quercus-georgiana-georgia-oak.html
 https://apps.acesag.auburn.edu/projects/plants/plant/view.php?plantid=4ca0f4ff9a16f7.67440683
 https://etc.usf.edu/clipart/81200/81232/81232_georgiaoak.htm

georgiana
Endemic flora of the United States
Trees of the Southeastern United States
Flora of Alabama
Flora of Georgia (U.S. state)
Flora of South Carolina
Plants described in 1849
Endangered flora of the United States
Taxa named by Moses Ashley Curtis